Fertile is a condition whereby organisms (including animals and humans) are able to produce physically healthy offspring.

Fertile may also refer to:

Fertile, Iowa, a small city in the United States
Fertile, Minnesota, a small city in the United States
Fertile, Missouri, an unincorporated community
Fertile, Saskatchewan, an unincorporated community in Canada
"Fertile", a song by The Throes on Ameroafriasiana

See also
Fertile material, nuclides from which fissile material can be generated
Fertile soil, soil that can support plant growth